Górski (feminine: Górska; plural: Górscy) is a Polish-language surname which belongs to several noble Polish families. Variants found in other countries include Gorski, Gorsky, Gurski, Gursky (phonetic from Polish with diacritics).

Notable people with this surname include:

Górski or Górska 
 Adrienne Górska (1899–1969), Polish architect
 Andrzej Górski (died 1626), Polish nobleman
 Andrzej Wincenty Górski (1920–2017), Polish chemistry professor
 Andrzeja Górska (1917-2007), Polish Catholic nun
 Artur Górski (1970-2016), Polish politician
 Halina Górska (1898-1942), Polish communist writer
 Henryk Górski (born 1938), Polish sport shooter
 Irena Górska-Damięcka (1910-2008), Polish actress
 Jakub Górski (c. 1525-1583), Polish philosopher
 Jerzy Górski (1929-1997), Polish canoeist
 Jerzy Górski (footballer) (born 1948), Polish footballer 
 Kazimierz Górski (1921-2006), Polish football manager
 Konstanty Górski (1868-1934), Polish painter
 Krzysztof Górski (born 1958), Polish footballer 
 Leszek Górski (born 1961), Polish swimmer
 Maciej Górski (1944–2020), Polish diarist and politician
 Maciej Górski (born 1990), Polish footballer
 Mateusz Górski, Polish footballer
 Małgorzata Górska, Polish activist and conservationist
 Maria Górska, birth name of Tamara de Lempicka
 Michał Górski (1911-1985), Polish cross-country skier
 Rafał Górski (1973–2010), Polish historian, writer
 Stefania Górska (1907-1986), Polish actress
 Tomasz Górski, Polish canoeist
 Tomasz Górski (born 1973), Polish politician

Gorski 
Andrea Gorski (born 1970), American basketball coach
Andy Gorski (born 1981), English rugby league footballer
Bernd Gorski (born 1959), German footballer and manager
Bruno Berger-Gorski (born 1962), German opera director of Polish descent
Chester Gorski (1906-1975), politician from New York
David Gorski, cancer surgeon and blogger critical of alternative medicine
Dennis Gorski (1944–2021), politician in New York
Hedwig Gorski (born 1949), American poet, writer, scholar and artist
Henry Gorski (1918–2010), American Figurative Expressionist artist
Jack Gorski (1931-2006), American reproductive biologist, pioneer in estrogen endocrinology
Konstanty Gorski (1859-1924), Polish composer who trained in Russia
Mark Gorski (born 1960), American track cyclist and cycling manager
Martin Gorski (1886–1949), American politician
Mijo Gorski (born 1952), Croatian Roman Catholic prelate
Philip S. Gorski, American sociologist
Peter Gorski (1921-2007), German film director. 
Sergey Prokudin-Gorsky (1863-1944), chemist and photographer
Sheldon Gorski (born 1965), Canadian ice hockey coach
Tamara Gorski, Canadian actor
Tim Gorski, American cinematographer
Virginia Gorski, American actress better known as Virginia Gibson
Will Gorski, Sense8 character

Gurski 
Al Gursky (born 1940), American football linebacker
Andreas Gursky (born 1955), German photographer, author of the most expensive photography
Herbert Gursky (1930-2006), American astrophysics researcher
Louisa Gurski (born 1988), London 2012 Olympic Games finalist
Michael Gurski (born 1979), German football coach and former goalkeeper
Olga Gurski (1902-1975), Ukrainian painter
Samuel Gursky (born 1991), filmmaker
Solomon Gursky, fictional character from Solomon Gursky Was Here
Yulia Gurska, Ukrainian singer
Yuri Gurski (born 1983), Belarusian IT entrepreneur

Other 
Gorski Kotar
Gursky's spectral tarsier
Kazimierz Gorski Stadium
Wólka Górska
Wrąbczyn Górski

See also
 

Polish-language surnames
Polish toponymic surnames